Oseh Shalom is the only synagogue in Laurel, Maryland, and one of 5 Reconstructionist synagogues in the Baltimore-Washington Metropolitan Area. Members of the community hail from many nearby areas, including Howard, Montgomery, Prince George's, and Anne Arundel counties. Oseh Shalom was founded in 1966, and affiliated with the Reconstructionist movement in 1979.

Oseh Shalom is known for its distinctive synagogue building, with its blue "wings" and glowing dome. Weekly Sabbath tefillah (prayer) services, religious school, adult education, High Holy Day and festival services and numerous other programs occur onsite. Oseh Shalom has a vibrant program for children from birth to Bar/Bat Mitzvah and beyond.

Daria and Josh Jacobs Velde, a married team of rabbis, became the congregation's rabbis in August 2017. Cantor Charles (Charlie) Bernhardt has been with Oseh Shalom since 1983.

Notes 

1966 establishments in Maryland
Buildings and structures in Laurel, Maryland
Reconstructionist synagogues in the United States
Jewish organizations established in 1966
Synagogues completed in 1991
Synagogues in Prince George's County, Maryland